Bangladesh Forms and Publication Office is a Bangladesh government department under the Ministry of Public Administration. The department is responsible for supplying official documents including land registration, marriage certificates, money receipts, etc. to government offices.

History
Bangladesh Forms and Publication Office started an part of the East Pakistan Government Press. After the Independence of Bangladesh in 1972 it was separated from the Bangladesh Government Press and renamed Bangladesh Forms and Publication Office.

References

1972 establishments in Bangladesh
Organisations based in Dhaka
Government agencies of Bangladesh
Government departments of Bangladesh